Hariram is an Indian politician. He was a member of 17th Legislative Assembly of Duddhi, Uttar Pradesh of India. A member of the Apna Dal (Sonelal) party, he represented the Dudhi constituency of Uttar Pradesh.

Political career
Hariram won from Duddhi Constituency, a reserved Constituency for Scheduled Castes, in the 2017 Uttar Pradesh Legislative Assembly election by defeating Vijay Singh Gond of Bahujan Samaj Party by a margin of 1085 votes.

Posts held

See also
Uttar Pradesh Legislative Assembly

References

Uttar Pradesh MLAs 2017–2022
Apna Dal (Sonelal) politicians
Living people
Year of birth missing (living people)